Joseph B. Willigers, MHM (October 26, 1930 – September 30, 2012) was the Roman Catholic bishop of the Roman Catholic Diocese of Jinja in Jinja, Uganda. His episcopal motto was De petra melle (with honey from the rock), Psalm 81; 17.

Ordained to the priesthood in 1955, Willigers was named bishop in 1967 and retired in 2010.
Joseph Bernard Louis Willigers entered St. Joseph's Missionary Society of Mill Hill when he was 19. In 1955, aged 25, he was ordained in London by Cardinal Bernard Griffin and sent to Rome to study Canon Law. Upon his graduation in 1958 he left for Africa to work in the mission. He worked in education and basic pastoral care in Uganda and Kenya and in 1965 as vicar general of the Kenyan Diocese of Kisumu, under the Dutch bishop Jan de Reeper. In 1967 Msgr. Willigers was appointed as the first bishop of the Diocese of Jinja, east of the Ugandan capital of Kampala. His consecration was performed by Archbishop Emmanuel Nsubuga, later Uganda's first cardinal. For an impressive 42 years, Bishop Willigers led the faithful of his diocese, until he retired in March 2010. As bishop, Msgr. Willigers was inspired by the spirituality of Blessed Charles de Foucauld and was characterised as intelligent, hospitable and warm.

In 2009, he participated in the Synod of Bishops’ Assembly on Africa. His contacts with his native diocese of Roermond continued through the years, as Roermond financially supported projects in Jinja, and as Bishop Willigers had family back home.

Returning to the Netherlands in ill health, Bishop Willigers took up residence in the Vrijland mission house in Oosterbeek, where he died in the early morning 1 October 2012, in the presence of his sister.

Notes

1930 births
2012 deaths
20th-century Roman Catholic bishops in Uganda
20th-century Dutch Roman Catholic priests
21st-century Roman Catholic bishops in Uganda
Roman Catholic bishops of Jinja